The 2015 Australian Super Series was the fifth Super Series tournament of the 2015 BWF Super Series in badminton. The tournament was held in Sydney, Australia from 26 to 31 May 2015 with a total purse of $750,000.

Players by nation

Men's singles

Seeds

Top half

Bottom half

Finals

Women's singles

Seeds

Top half

Bottom half

Finals

Men's doubles

Seeds

Top half

Bottom half

Finals

Women's doubles

Seeds

Top half

Bottom half

Finals

Mixed doubles

Seeds

Top half

Bottom half

Finals

References 

Australian Open (badminton)
Australian Super Series
Sports competitions in Sydney
Super Series